During the 1956–57 English football season, Brentford competed in the Football League Third Division South. Despite topping the table early in the season, a poor run of form dropped the club to the lower reaches of mid-table by February 1957. A strong final two months of the season lifted the Bees to an 8th-place finish.

Season summary 
With Brentford having failed to challenge for promotion since relegation to the Third Division South in 1954, reduced attendances at Griffin Park meant that manager Bill Dodgin Sr. again had little to spend in the transfer market, with his lone acquisition being full back Sid Russell from local Sunday league football. Frank Latimer and Billy Sperrin were released after many years' service, in addition to more recent signings Leonard Geard, James Robertson and George Stobbart.

Brentford had a dream start to the 1956–57 season, winning the opening four matches and sitting atop the table. Three subsequent defeats dropped the Bees to as low as 13th-place, before top spot was again reached after another three wins in September 1956. Forwards Jeff Taylor and George Francis (supported by Jim Towers) were in imperious form, with Taylor having scored 9 goals and Francis 8 goals after 10 matches. A 4–0 defeat away to Ipswich Town on 22 September ended the run and Brentford won just three of next 20 league matches, with Taylor and Francis completely losing form and Towers spending periods out injured. The signing of Chelsea forward Eric Parsons had little impact. The Bees reached their nadir on 19 January 1957, losing 7–0 to Walsall, a scoreline which equalled the club's record defeat. Three matches later, Brentford lost 5–1 to Northampton Town and completed a slide from 1st position on 18 September 1956 to 17th on 16 February 1957. Jim Towers' return to full fitness coincided with the team's return to form in March, with George Francis scoring five goals amidst a run of four consecutive wins. After victory over Southend United on 12 March, chairman Frank Davis announced that manager Bill Dodgin Sr. would be leaving Griffin Park at the end of the campaign. Brentford lost just two of the remaining 11 matches of the season and battled to an 8th-place finish.

A number of club records were set or equalled during the season:
 Record league defeat: 0–7 versus Walsall, 19 January 1957
 Consecutive away league wins: 5 (21 April – 29 August 1956)
 Consecutive league draws: 5 (16 March – 6 April 1957)
 Most home league games without a clean sheet: 16 (3 March – 20 October 1956)

League table

Results
Brentford's goal tally listed first.

Legend

Football League Third Division South

FA Cup

 Sources: 100 Years Of Brentford, Statto, 11v11

Playing squad 
Players' ages are as of the opening day of the 1956–57 season.

 Sources: 100 Years Of Brentford, Timeless Bees

Coaching staff

Statistics

Appearances and goals

Players listed in italics left the club mid-season.
Source: 100 Years Of Brentford

Goalscorers 

Players listed in italics left the club mid-season.
Source: 100 Years Of Brentford

Representative caps

Management

Summary

Transfers & loans

References 

Brentford F.C. seasons
Brentford